Paris is a home rule-class city in Bourbon County, Kentucky. Paris is the seat of its county and forms part of the Lexington–Fayette Metropolitan Statistical Area. As of 2020, it had a population of 9,846.

History

Joseph Houston settled a station in the area in 1776, but was forced to relocate due to prior land grants. In 1786, Lawrence Protzman purchased the area of present-day Paris from its owners, platted  for a town, and offered land for public buildings in exchange for the Virginia legislature making the settlement the seat of the newly formed Bourbon County. In 1789, the town was formally established as Hopewell after Hopewell, New Jersey, his hometown. The next year, it was renamed Paris after the French capital to match its county and honor the French assistance during the American Revolution.

Among the early settlers in the late 18th and early 19th centuries were French refugees who had fled the excesses of their own revolution. One Frenchman was noted in a 19th-century state history as having come from Calcutta, via Bengal, and settled here as a schoolteacher.

The post office was briefly known as Bourbontown or Bourbonton in the early 19th century, but there is no evidence that this name was ever formally applied to the town itself. It was incorporated as Paris in 1839 and again in 1890.

Paris is the "sister city" of Lamotte-Beuvron in France.

Geography

Demographics

As of the census of 2000, there were 9,183 people, 3,857 households, and 2,487 families residing in the city. The racial makeup of the city was 84.23% White, 12.71% African American, 0.16% Native American, 0.16% Asian, 1.35% from other races, and 1.38% from two or more races. Hispanic or Latino of any race were 2.62% of the population.

There were 3,857 households, out of which 31.9% had children under the age of 18 living with them, 43.8% were married couples living together, 16.5% had a female householder with no husband present, and 35.5% were non-families. 31.2% of all households were made up of individuals, and 14.2% had someone living alone who was 65 years of age or older. The average household size was 2.33 and the average family size was 2.90.

In the city, the population was spread out, with 25.3% under the age of 18, 9.0% from 18 to 24, 28.5% from 25 to 44, 21.6% from 45 to 64, and 15.7% who were 65 years of age or older. The median age was 36 years. For every 100 females, there were 88.9 males. For every 100 females age 18 and over, there were 82.7 males.

The median income for a household in the city was $30,872, and the median income for a family was $37,358. Males had a median income of $29,275 versus $21,285 for females. The per capita income for the city was $16,645. About 17.5% of families and 17.8% of the population were below the poverty line, including 24.2% of those under age 18 and 15.9% of those age 65 or over.

Education
Local schools in includes, Paris High School (in the Paris Independent Schools district), and Bourbon County High School (in the Bourbon County Schools district). Paris has a public library, the Paris-Bourbon County Library.

Arts and culture
The Main Street stretch of Paris is a product of much time, effort, and money put into the preservation and revitalization of historic buildings downtown. With a handful of new restaurants garnering attention from the Central Kentucky region and beyond, a variety of downtown Paris businesses are reaping the benefits.

The Main Street Program in Paris has been active since 1992. From 2006 to 2008, fifteen buildings were renovated at a favorable time for financing such projects. More renovations were underway. Many projects used grants to renovate façades, under a program administered through GOLD, a state-funded program that works with Renaissance on Main to reward communities that "take steps to revitalize and maintain vibrant, economically sound development in Kentucky's downtown areas."

Downtown Paris ARTWALK, sponsored by the Paris Main Street Program, and founded by Miranda Reynolds and Steve Walton, has become a major social and artistic event in downtown Paris.

The Nannine Clay Wallis Arboretum, located at 616 Pleasant Street, is a  arboretum that is home to the Garden Club of Kentucky. Many of the trees on the grounds were planted in the 1850s when the house was built. Nannine Clay Wallis continued the tradition of planting the latest tree introductions when her father bought the property in 1900. New trees are always being added to the collection. Her daylilies and those hybridized by a former GCKY president, roses and other flowers are also featured. Admission is free.

The Hopewell Museum, located at 800 Pleasant Street, is free and open to the public on Wednesday through Saturday afternoons. The museum is closed the month of January. The Beaux Arts structure was built in 1909 and served as the area's first post office.

Duncan Tavern, located in Courthouse Square, is home to the Kentucky Society of the Daughters of the American Revolution. The stone structure was built in 1788 by Major Joseph Duncan. It now houses an extensive genealogical collection, and is open to the public for tours Tuesday through Saturday for tours.
 The Vardens Building, located at 509 Main Street, is an example of Victorian architecture and interior design. Remodeled in 1891, the building housed Vardens and Son Druggists from 1888 to 1953. The "new" façade features pressed-metal Corinthian columns embellished with rosettes. For the inside, Varden had South African mahogany apothecary cabinets made to show his wares. To accent the cabinetry he ordered Tiffany Glass Company stained glass windows. The three-story building once had a surgeon and dental office on the second floor. The Vardens Building still has a ballroom on its top floor. The Grand Ballroom hosted many community dances and parties, serving as the ballroom to the Fordham Hotel, formerly located next door. The building was recently bought and incorporated into the Vardens Complex, a multi-use project with retail, office, and restaurant space.
The Shinner Building, located on the corner of 8th and Main streets, is listed by Ripley's Believe It or Not! as the world's tallest three-story structure. Built in 1891, it is used for the Paradise Cafe.

Six miles east of Paris is the Cane Ridge Meeting House. Built in 1791, it is said to be the largest one-room log structure in the country. The log building is now housed inside a large stone structure, which protects it from the elements. The Cane Ridge Meeting House is one of the sites of the Great Revival of 1801, where an estimated 25,000 worshipers gathered. From that revival, the Christian Church, Churches of Christ, and the Disciples of Christ (DOC) were founded, seeking to restore Christianity to its non-denominational beginnings.

Notable people
William Patterson Alexander (1805–1884), missionary in Hawaii
Bill Arnsparger (1926–2015), football coach, head coach of New York Giants
Pauline Redmond Coggs (1912 – 2005), social worker, civil rights activist
Blanton Collier (1906–1983), NFL coach of 1964 champion Cleveland Browns
Joseph Duncan (1794–1844), sixth Governor of Illinois
John Price Durbin (1800-1876), Chaplain of the Senate, President of Dickinson College
William Lee D. Ewing (1795–1846), fifth Governor of Illinois
Lemuel T. Fisher, newspaper publisher
John Fox, Jr. (1862–1919), author of The Little Shepherd of Kingdom Come and The Trail of the Lonesome Pine
Silvana Gallardo, actress and acting coach, was living in Paris at the time of her death
James G. Jones (1814–1872), first mayor of Evansville, Indiana, Indiana Attorney General
Mary Rootes Thornton McAboy (1815–1892), poet
Garrett Morgan (1877–1963), invented tri-state traffic signal and emergency breathing device
George Snyder, silversmith, clockmaker, and inventor of modern bait-casting fishing reel
Robert Trimble, Associate Justice of the Supreme Court of the United States
Jim Tucker (1932–2020), basketball player, attended Paris Western High School
Francis Marion Wood (1878–943), educator and school administrator, worked in Paris

References

External links
 
 Paris-Bourbon County Chamber of Commerce

Cities in Bourbon County, Kentucky
Cities in Kentucky
County seats in Kentucky
Lexington–Fayette metropolitan area
Populated places established in 1789
1789 establishments in Virginia